The 2015 Air Force Falcons football team represented the United States Air Force Academy during the 2015 NCAA Division I FBS football season. The Falcons were led by ninth-year head coach Troy Calhoun and played their home games at Falcon Stadium. They were members of the Mountain West Conference in the Mountain Division. They finished the season 8–6, 6–2 in Mountain West play to win the Mountain Division championship. They represented the Mountain Division in the Mountain West Championship Game where they lost to West Division champion San Diego State. They were invited to the Armed Forces Bowl where they lost to California.

Schedule

Game summaries

Morgan State

San Jose State

at Michigan State

at Navy

Wyoming

at Colorado State

Fresno State

at Hawaii

Army

Utah State

at Boise State

at New Mexico

Mountain West Championship Game–at San Diego State

Armed Forces Bowl–California

References

Air Force
Air Force Falcons football seasons
Air Force Falcons football